The 2010 Men's Australian Hockey League was the 20th edition of the men's field hockey tournament. The finals week of the tournament was held in the Queensland city of Brisbane.

The WA Thundersticks won the gold medal for the ninth time by defeating the NSW Waratahs 4–3 in the final.

Competition format
The format included five round-matches over two weekends and a finals week that consisted of two round-matches and three pool matches for a place in the final.

After all the round matches were complete the teams were ranked 1–8 depending on the total number of points earned in all their round matches.

The teams ranked 1, 4, 6 & 8 progressed to Pool A, while teams ranked 2, 3, 5 & 7 progressed to Pool B. All previously earned points were removed with the teams in each pool playing each other once more. At the completion of the pool matches, the top team from each pool advanced to the League Final.

Teams

  Canberra Lakers
  Southern Hotshots

  NSW Waratahs
  Tassie Tigers

  NT Stingers
  VIC Vikings

  QLD Blades
  WA Thundersticks

Results

Preliminary round

Fixtures

Classification round

Pool matches

Pool A

Pool B

Classification matches

Seventh and eighth place

Fifth and sixth place

Third and fourth place

Final

Statistics

Final standings

Goalscorers

References

External links

2010
2010 in Australian men's field hockey